Surrey North was a federal electoral district in British Columbia, Canada, that was represented in the House of Commons of Canada from 1988 to 2015. It covered the northern part of Surrey.

It was home to 106,904 residents in 2001, more than 46 percent of whom are immigrants—21 percent of residents are East Indian, the second-highest concentration in Canada. Most residents are employed in the manufacturing and service sectors, with an average family income of $50,445 and an unemployment rate of nine percent.

Geography

Bounded by the Fraser River at the north and west, the riding stretched south to 88th Avenue, King George Highway, 120th Street, and 96th Avenue, and east to Fraser Highway and 152nd Street.

History
The riding was formed in 1986 from portions of Surrey—White Rock—North Delta, Surrey Central, and Fraser Valley West ridings. The riding was revised in 1996 and 2003.

Members of Parliament

Election results

 	

|- bgcolor="white"

|align="left" colspan=2|NDP gain from Independent
|align="right"|Swing
|align="right"|+3.2
|align="right"|

* Note: Chuck Cadman's share of the popular vote as an independent candidate declined by -12.31 from his share as the Canadian Alliance candidate in the 2000 election.

Note: Conservative Party vote is compared to the total of the Canadian Alliance and Progressive Conservative vote in the 2000 election.

 
Note: Canadian Alliance vote is compared to the Reform Party vote in the 1997 election.

See also
 List of Canadian federal electoral districts
 Past Canadian electoral districts

References

 CBC Riding Profile
 Library of Parliament Riding Profile
 Expenditures – 2004
 Expenditures – 2000
 Expenditures – 1997

Notes

External links
 Website of the Parliament of Canada

Former federal electoral districts of British Columbia
Federal electoral districts in Greater Vancouver and the Fraser Valley
Politics of Surrey, British Columbia